Alashankou railway station, also known as Alataw Pass railway station (also spelt Alatau and Ala Tau), is a railway station in Börtala Mongol Autonomous Prefecture of China's Xinjiang Uyghur Autonomous Region.

Located on the Chinese side of the Dzungarian Gate pass through the Dzungarian Alatau mountain range at the 2358.376 km point of Lanxin Railway, it is the last station on the Northern Xinjiang branch of the Lanxin Railway before entering Kazakhstan. For the first twenty-plus years of its history it was the only railway port of entry in Western China; during this time, the amount of international rail freight going through the Alashankou port of entry increased from 160,000 tonnes in 1991 to 15,160,000 tonnes in 2011.

In another report, the tonnes of rail freight crossing the border at Alashankou during the first 10 months of 2011 were reported as 8,921,000, which was said to be a 12.8 % increase over the previous year. The mass of traffic of going from Kazakhstan to China is much higher than from China to Kazakhstan (7,412,000 tonnes vs. 1,509,000 tonnes). The main commodities that went from Kazakhstan to China via Alashankou were iron ore, high-carbon ferrochrome, wheat and steel. Among the goods shipped from China to Kazakhstan, the main groups were steel (in particular, steel pipes), electronics and tomato paste.

There is also a passenger train, Almaty-Ürümqi, that crosses the border at Alashankou. The second railway port of entry on the Sino-Kazakh border, at Khorgas, opened to rail traffic in December 2012.

See also
Ürümqi railway station

Notes

Railway stations in Xinjiang
China–Kazakhstan border crossings
Stations on the Northern Xinjiang Railway